The OG-107 was the basic work utility uniform (fatigues) of all branches of the United States Armed Forces from 1952 until its discontinuation in 1989. The designation came from the U.S. Army's coloring code "Olive Green 107" and "Olive Green 507", which were shades of dark green, the OG-107 being cotton and OG-507 polyester-cotton blend introduced in the early 1970s. Regardless of the fabric, the two shades were almost identical. The OG-107 was superseded by the Battle Dress Uniform (BDU) throughout the 1980s, and was also used by several other countries, including ones that received military aid from the United States.

All versions of the OG-107 shared several basic design features. They were made out of an 8.5 ounce cotton sateen. The shirt could be tucked in or worn outside the trousers depending on the preference of the local commander. If sufficiently hot and humid, troops could be permitted to roll up the sleeves and unblouse the trousers.  It consisted of a button front and two simple patch pockets on the upper chest that closed by means of a buttoned flap. The trousers were straight leg pants intended to be bloused (tucked in) into boot tops with two simple patch pockets in the front with slash openings and two simple patch pockets on the back with a button flap. The cotton versions tended to fade quickly to greenish grey while the poly-cotton variant used in the OG-507 stayed darker much longer.

History
The OG-107 uniform was introduced in 1952, and, succeeding the M1943 Uniform, it became the standard for use both in the United States and on overseas deployment by the beginning of the Vietnam War. As the Tropical Combat Uniform (jungle fatigues) became more plentiful in South Vietnam, they began to replace the OG-107 Uniform in combat units. A rough time line is that line infantry units from "standard" divisions (not airborne or Special Forces) began receiving jungle fatigues in the spring of 1966 and the OG-107 was slowly relegated to use in rear areas.

In the United States and foreign postings (outside of Southeast Asia), the OG-107 remained the standard uniform throughout the 1960s and 1970s. This is one of the longest issued uniforms by the US Military, seeing use from 1952 until the adoption of the poly-cotton blend OG-507 in 1975. Minor modifications were made to the uniform over time such as adding buttoned cuff slits in the mid-1960s.

Basic designs
There were three basic models or "patterns" for the OG-107 Cotton Sateen Utility Uniform:

"Type I" (1952–1963)

The first "Type I" model was introduced in 1952 and remained virtually unchanged through its 10-year production run. The shirt featured a sleeve with no true cuff or buttons; it was simply a straight sleeve with a simple hem at the cuff. The shirt's two chest pockets and the trousers rear two pockets had a rectangular pocket flap that buttoned. The buttons were a "dished" style and most of the 1950s production were a dark brown color while the majority of the 1960s production were dark green. The trousers also had a simple adjustment tab on the waist that could be buttoned. The shirt and trousers were also sized in groups (Small, Medium, Large, etc.) This model was replaced in April 1963 when specifications came out for the second model.

"Type II" (1963–1964)
The "Type II" was specified for production in April 1963 and had several slight variations from the Type I. The only change of any real significance was the "clipping" of the pocket flaps on the shirt, so that they no longer appeared rectangular. As with the Type I, the shirt and trousers were also sized in groups. Due to the limited production time before the Type III was specified, these were not seen nearly as often as the Type I or III.

"Type III" (1964–1989)

The "Type III" is the most common model and can be split into two versions based on the time of manufacture and material.

Cotton – This version was specified at the very end of 1964 and still used the standard 8.5 ounce cotton sateen. However, due to changes in production and distribution time, they were not really seen until 1966. This version maintained all of the key distinctive style features such as the pockets, etc., but with some key differences. The two shirt chest pockets received a pointed pocket flap. The shirt also received a button cuff at the wrist. The buttons were changed to the "standard" dull plastic button as used on jungle fatigues (and later BDUs). Another change to the trousers was the removal of the waist adjustment tab. Both the shirt and pants also adopted the "true measurement" sizing style – for example, pants were marked in waist and inseam length (32" x 34" would show pants with a 32" waist and 34" inseam) and the shirts were marked in neck size and sleeve length (16.5" x 34" would show a shirt with a 16.5" neck and a 34" sleeve length).  The cotton uniform was commonly referred to as "starchies".

Poly Cotton blend – The second version, the OG-507, came into use in 1975  and was in production until 1989, when it was fully replaced by the woodland BDU. This model switched from using 100% cotton to a 50/50 blend of Polyester/Cotton. These mixed OG-507s were often referred to as "Dura-Press" or "Permanent press" as they did not require extensive starching and they could often be quickly identified by a yellow tag in the garment. Many of the late OG-507s saw use in the United States Armed Forces as fatigues for female service members.  The poly/cotton uniforms were commonly referred to as "wash and wears".  Starting in late 1980 they were phased out in favor of the new Battle Dress Uniform (BDU).

Variants
Privately purchased, tailored versions with modifications were often produced. Officers occasionally added shoulder straps as found on service uniforms. Other common variations included "cigarette pockets" closed by buttoned flaps on both upper sleeves, a pen pocket added on the left sleeve above the elbow, and additional side "cargo" pockets on the trousers.

A variation of the uniform was issued to female service members. It included shirts that had the buttons on the left instead of the right, and both pieces were cut to fit women.

Users

 
 
  – After the Cuban Revolution, the FAR continued wearing the same uniforms.
 
  – Wears a copy.
 
 
 
  – Had a special domestic variant of the OG-107 worn by the Lebanese Armed Forces and Internal Security Forces during the Lebanese Civil War; replaced by the U.S. Woodland Battle Dress Uniform (BDU) in 1983-84.
 
  – Worn first by the National Guard of Nicaragua and after 1979 by the EPS.
 
 
  - Had a special domestic HBT variant of the OG-107 worn during the Vietnam War.
 
 
  Thailand – Formerly used by the Thai Armed Forces but now only used by Territorial Defense Students.
 
   Uruguayan Air Force uniforms worn until the mid-90s when it was changed to the BDU.

See also
 M1951 Field Cap and Ridgeway Cap
 M-1951 field jacket
 M-1965 field jacket
 Feldgrau

References

Bibliography

Further reading

External links

United States Army uniforms
United States military uniforms
Military equipment introduced in the 1950s